Christ Church (Episcopal) is an historic Carpenter Gothic church in Fort Meade, Florida. It is located at 1 N. Cleveland Avenue. On May 6, 1976, it was added to the U.S. National Register of Historic Places.

References

External links

 
Polk County listings at National Register of Historic Places
Florida's Office of Cultural and Historical Programs
Polk County listings

Episcopal church buildings in Florida
National Register of Historic Places in Polk County, Florida
Churches on the National Register of Historic Places in Florida
Carpenter Gothic church buildings in Florida
Churches in Polk County, Florida
1889 establishments in Florida
Churches completed in 1889
Fort Meade, Florida